The 2005 Petit Le Mans was the ninth race for the 2005 American Le Mans Series season held at Road Atlanta.  It took place on October 1, 2005.

Official results

Class winners in bold.  Cars failing to complete 70% of winner's distance marked as Not Classified (NC).

Statistics
 Pole Position - #15 Zytek Engineering - 1:10.781
 Fastest Lap - #1 ADT Champion Racing - 1:12.958
 Average Speed -

External links

 

P
Petit Le Mans